Shuttleworth may refer to:

 Shuttleworth (surname)
 Shuttleworth, Greater Manchester (historically in Lancashire), a hamlet at the northeastern extremity of the Metropolitan Borough of Bury, England
 Shuttleworth (canvassing)
 The Shuttleworth Collection, an aeronautical and automotive museum located at the Old Warden airfield in Bedfordshire, England
 Shuttleworth College (Bedfordshire), a further education college in Bedfordshire, England
 Shuttleworth College (Lancashire), an 11–16 mixed comprehensive school in Burnley, England
 Shuttleworth Foundation
 The Shuttleworths, British comedy show

See also
 Shuttleworth & Ingersoll a law firm in Iowa, US 
Shuttlesworth, a surname